48 Angels is a 2007 drama film directed by Marion Comer and starring Shane Brolly, John Travers, Ciaran Flynn, and Sean McGinley.

Plot
Seamus (Ciaran Flynn) is a 9-year-old boy who has been diagnosed with a serious illness. In search of a miracle, he sets off to find God before God comes for him. Inspired by Saint Columcille  and his journey to the island of Iona, Seamus sets out in a small boat without oars or sail. On his quest he encounters James (John Travers) and Darry (Shane Brolly). Despite initial conflict, the trio decide to stay together and enter upon a journey that results in the healing of hearts and minds.

External links

2007 drama films
2007 films
Irish drama films
English-language Irish films
2000s English-language films